Waddy Thompson Jr. (January 8, 1798 – November 23, 1868) was a U.S. Representative from South Carolina and U.S. Minister to Mexico, 1842–44.

Born in Pickensville, Ninety-Six District, South Carolina—near Easley in present Pickens County—Thompson was reared in Greenville. He graduated from South Carolina College in 1814 when he was 16; and he was admitted to the bar in 1819, beginning practice in Edgefield, South Carolina, and marrying Emmala Butler, the daughter one of the state's richest plantation owners. About 1824 the couple moved to Greenville, where Thompson became politically active. He served as member of the South Carolina House of Representatives from 1826 to 1829. Thompson was elected solicitor of the western circuit in 1830.

Fervently supporting the theory of Vice President John C. Calhoun that a state could nullify an act of the U.S. Congress, in 1832 Thompson introduced a resolution in the South Carolina General Assembly calling for a convention to nullify the "Tariff of Abominations."  The nullification crisis dissipated the following year; but in the meantime Thompson was appointed brigadier general of South Carolina militia, and he was thereafter referred to as "General Thompson."

In 1835, Thompson was elected as an Anti-Jacksonian to the 24th United States Congress to fill the vacancy caused by the death of Warren R. Davis. He was reelected as a Whig to the 25th and 26th Congresses serving from September 10, 1835, to March 3, 1841. Thompson served as chairman of the Committee on Military Affairs in the 26th Congress.

In 1842 President John Tyler appointed Thompson Envoy Extraordinary and Minister Plenipotentiary to Mexico, where he served from February 10, 1842, to March 9, 1844.  Thompson quickly learned enough Spanish to make his first speech to Mexican cabinet members in that language.  He became friendly with Mexican president Antonio López de Santa Anna and succeeded in having 300 Texan prisoners freed. Two years after his return to the United States, Thompson published  Recollections of Mexico, and he opposed the Mexican War.

Thompson returned to Greenville and managed plantations in Edgefield and Madison, Florida—the latter of which was 1,300 acres and employed 80 slaves. After his wife died in 1848, he married Cornelia Jones of Wilmington, North Carolina, and eventually moved to Paris Mountain, near Greenville, where he owned a 1,000 acres and built two large identical houses, one for himself and the other for his wife—though the couple seemed to be on good terms. Thompson filled his house with Mexican memorabilia and employed a full-time gardener to care for exotic plants and shrubs he had collected.

By the time of the Civil War, Thompson had become a Unionist, but the conclusion of the war nevertheless ruined him.  In 1866 he sold his Paris Mountain property and moved to his Florida plantation. The Florida legislature appointed him solicitor general of a circuit in 1868, but in 1868 he died while in Tallahassee, and he was buried in the churchyard of St. John's Episcopal Church there.

Sources

External links
Texas State Historical Association - Waddy Thompson
Southern Historical Collection at UNC-CH holds his papers as envoy to Mexico
Stuart A. Rose Manuscript, Archives, and Rare Book Library, Emory University: Waddy Thompson papers, 1848-1865

1798 births
1868 deaths
Members of the United States House of Representatives from South Carolina
South Carolina Whigs
South Carolina National Republicans
American militia generals
19th-century American diplomats
National Republican Party members of the United States House of Representatives
Whig Party members of the United States House of Representatives
19th-century American politicians
Ambassadors of the United States to Mexico
South Carolina state solicitors